"Finish What Ya Started" is a song by Van Halen taken from their 1988 album OU812.

Background
Despite the album being seemingly complete, Eddie Van Halen came up with the riff at 2 in the morning and went down to his then-neighbor Sammy Hagar to show it. Hagar let Eddie in, and the two played guitars in his balcony until they had a completed song. Once Eddie left, Hagar decided to write the lyrics despite being late at night. The theme wound up being unfulfilled sex, summed up by Hagar as "blue balls". In the song, Eddie recorded his guitar part on a Fender Stratocaster plugged direct into the studio mixing console. The song is one of only two Van Halen tracks featuring Hagar playing a rhythm guitar part, which he played on a Gibson acoustic.

Music video
The official music video for the song was directed by Andy Morahan. It features the band playing against a plain white background with quick cuts to women dancing. The version of the song on their 2004 compilation The Best of Both Worlds stops midway through the outro, unlike the fade out on the OU812 version.

Reception
Cash Box called it "a remarkable single...that owes more to T-Rex and Creedence than to a Whitesnake."

In 1988, the song peaked at #13 on the Billboard Hot 100 and #2 on the Billboard rock chart.

In popular culture
The song was later used as theme music for the short-lived 1990 sitcom Sydney, which starred Eddie Van Halen's then-wife, Valerie Bertinelli.

References

Further reading

1987 songs
1988 singles
Country rock songs
Music videos directed by Andy Morahan
Songs written by Eddie Van Halen
Songs written by Alex Van Halen
Songs written by Michael Anthony (musician)
Songs written by Sammy Hagar
Van Halen songs
Warner Records singles